Eupithecia impavida is a moth in the family Geometridae. It is widespread, ranging from the western Himalayas through southern and central China to Japan.

References

Moths described in 1979
impavida
Moths of Asia